Stuart Greenbaum (born 1966) is an Australian composer and professor of music composition at the University of Melbourne. He is currently the Head of Composition at the Melbourne Conservatorium of Music.

Greenbaum has had his work performed by both the Sydney Symphony Orchestra and the Melbourne Symphony Orchestra.

Life and career 

Stuart Greenbaum grew up in Melbourne, his mother a trained classical composer who taught music at Deakin University. His original influences when young were pop, rock and blues, before later becoming interested in jazz. Greenbaum went on to study composition with Brenton Broadstock and Barry Conyngham at the University of Melbourne. Greenbaum plays the piano, as well as the oboe and the electric guitar.

He collaborated with the Melbourne poet Ross Baglin to create 20 works, including a 24-minute choral composition.

The early 1990s saw Greenbaum producing a number of pieces for stage, including a time as the resident composer at the Playbox Theatre in Melbourne. In 1993, as a young composer, he was commissioned to write Aaron Copland: In Memoriam, the first of a series of ten works commissioned by the Australian Broadcasting Corporation by young Australian composers. One of his first major works to be commissioned was The Foundling, commissioned by Cantori New York in 1997, and From the Beginning commissioned for the sesquicentenary of the Royal Melbourne Philharmonic in 2003.

Greenbaum's work Nelson, a 3–act opera with libretto by Ross Baglin, was presented in London in 2005 and premiered in full at the 2007 Castlemaine State Festival. He was a featured composer at the 2006 Aurora Festival. In 2007 he was commissioned by the artistic director of the Southern Cross Soloists to compose a work featuring Marshall McGuire.

His work 90 Minutes Circling the Earth was named Orchestral Work of the Year at the 2008 Classical Music Awards. While it had been written in 1997, it was not recorded on CD till 10 years later, at which point it was brought to the attention of the judges. In 2009 he was Australia's representative for the Trans-Tasman Composer Exchange, working in Auckland with NZTrio on a new piano trio, The Year Without a Summer. This work toured nationally for Chamber Music New Zealand, in Sydney for the ISCM World New Music Days (2010) and internationally at the City of London Festival (2011).

Greenbaum lives in Melbourne, Australia with his wife, a violinist.

Awards 
 Orchestral Work of the Year 2008 (at the APRA Music Awards of 2008)
 Dorian Le Galliene Composition Award
 The Heinz Harant Prize
 Albert H. Maggs Composition Award

Discography 
Music for Theatre (Playbox, 1992)
Mercurial (Reed Music, 2005)
800 Million Heartbeats (ABC Classics, 2013)
Mondrian Interiors (ABC Classics, 2015)
Satellite Mapping (Move Records, 2016)
Return Journey (ABC Classics, 2018)
The Thin Blue Line (ABC Classics, 2018)
The Final Hour (Lyrebird Productions, 2019)
Electric Confession (Salisbury Records, 2021)
A Trillion Miles of Darkness (ABC Classics, 2022)

Selected major works 

Sonata for Flute, Viola and Harp – The Way Through, 2022
Symphony No.5 – Brought to Light, 2022
Piano Sonata No.2 – Journey into Darkness, 2021
Sonata for Harp – The Bamboo Forest, 2020
Sonata for Tuba and Piano – Underland, 2019
Sonata for Horn and Piano – Hiroshima, 2019
Sonata for Bassoon and Piano – Deep Time, 2019
Sonata for Organ – Transport Abandoned, 2019
Sonata for Percussion and Piano – Parallel Universe, 2019
Sonata for Violin and Viola – From Far Above, 2018
Far Beyond the Evening Sky – Symphony for Strings, 2018
Sonata for Cor Anglais and Piano – Abandoned Places, 2018
Tide Moon Earth Sun – concerto for Harp and Strings, 2018
Sonata for Cello and Piano – Another Earth, 2018
Translations, for recorder, erhu and string quartet, 2017
Symphony No.3 – Supernova, 2017
Sonata for Viola and Piano – Leaving Earth, 2017
String Quartet No.7 – Recognition, 2016
Sonata for Double Bass and Piano – Continental Drift, 2016
Sonata for Clarinet and Piano – A Trillion Miles of Darkness, 2016
String Quartet No.6 – Lonely Planet, 2015
Sonata for Trumpet and Piano, 2015
Sonata for Trombone and Piano, 2015
Sonata for Oboe and Piano, 2015
Sonata for Flute and Piano, 2015
The Gradual Slowing of the Earth – concerto for organ and symphonic winds, 2014
The Final Hour, for studio orchestra, narrator and electronics, 2013
Sonata for Guitar, 2013
Natural Satellite, for guitar duo, 2013
Sonata for Piano, 4-hands, 2013
Four Finalities, for soprano cor anglais and harp, 2012
Dance Music for Concert Halls, for clarinet, violin, cello and piano, 2012
Chamber Concerto No.2, 2011
Symphony No.2 – Double Planet, 2010
The Parrot Factory, an opera in 1 act, 2010
All Those Ways of Leaving, for sextet, 2009
The Year Without a Summer, for piano trio, 2009
Falling By Degrees, for violin and piano, 2009
Chamber Concerto, 2008
Easter Island, for septet, 2008
Mondrian Interiors, for solo harp and mixed quintet, 2007
Nelson, an opera in 3 acts, 2005
The Last Signal, for solo piano and chamber orchestra, 2005
From the Beginning, for large choir, organ and orchestra, 2003
Sonata for Alto Saxophone and Piano, 2002
Sonata for Violin and Piano, 2000
Symphony No.1 – Four Essay on the Passing of Time, 1998
The Foundling, for choir, vibraphone and string quartet, 1997
Ice Man, for solo piano, 1993
Letters to the Front, for soprano and orchestra, 1989

References

External links 

Australian Music Centre - Represented Artist page
Stuart Greenbaum ABC Chamber Composers

Australian composers
Australian male composers
1966 births
APRA Award winners
Living people
Winners of the Albert H. Maggs Composition Award